Tommasini is a surname of the following people:

Anthony Tommasini (born 1948),  chief music critic for The New York Times and author
Muzio Tommasini (1794–1879), Austrian botanist and politician from Trieste
Nicolas Tommasini (born 1971), French business executive and entrepreneur
Paolo Tommasini (born 1968), Italian sprint canoer
Tommaso Tommasini (Bishop of Lesina) (died 1463), known as Thomas of Hvar
Vincenzo Tommasini (1878–1950), Italian composer
Vittorio Osvaldo Tommasini (1879–1964), Italian painter and poet, known as Farfa

See also
Acteosaurus tommasini, extinct lizard, named after Muzio Tommasini
Tommasini's crocus, named after Muzio Tommasini
Tomasini, a similar name

Italian-language surnames
Patronymic surnames
Surnames from given names